Arene balboai is a species of sea snail, a marine gastropod mollusk in the family Areneidae.

Description

The shell can grow to be 3 mm to 4.5 mm in length.

Distribution
Arene Balboai can be found off of the Taboga Island and the Cocos Island.

References

External links
 To ITIS
 To World Register of Marine Species

Areneidae
Gastropods described in 1939